A Houario is a small two masted lateen rigged coastal, litoral, or riverine craft of Mediterranean origin and use. These boats are often used as pleasure craft.

References

Boat types